"Stand Proud" (stylized as "STAND PROUD") is a song by Jin Hashimoto, with lyrics by Shoko Fujibayashi, composition by Takatuku Wakabayashi, and arrangement (and guitars) by ZENTA. It is the first opening theme song for JoJo's Bizarre Adventure: Stardust Crusaders; a single was released on April 23, 2014. The edit for the television series' broadcasts was made available for purchase exclusively through Dwango's animelo service on April 12, 2014, as a preview, and the full length on the Chaku Uta Full service on April 18.

Track listing

Covers
Fantôme Iris, a fictional visual kei band from multimedia franchise Argonavis from BanG Dream! covered the song on their live Fantôme Iris Concept Live -Gekkoukyouen- held on September 23, 2021.

Chart performance
On the Oricon's Weekly Singles Charts, "Stand Proud" peaked at number 13 after being on the charts for 2 weeks. On Billboards Japan Hot 100, the song debuted and peaked at 11. On Billboards other charts in Japan, the song also performed well: number 3 on the Hot Animation  and Top Independent Albums and Singles charts, and 2 on the Hot Singles Sales charts.

References

External links

2014 singles
JoJo's Bizarre Adventure songs
2014 songs
Warner Music Group singles
Animated series theme songs